A political international is a transnational organization of political parties having similar ideology or political orientation (e.g. communism, socialism, and Islamism). The international works together on points of agreement to co-ordinate activity.

Political internationals have increased in popularity and influence since their beginnings in the political left of 19th-century Europe, as political activists have paid more attention to developments for or against their ideological favor in other countries and continents. After World War II, other ideological movements formed their political internationals to communicate among aligned parliamentarians and legislative candidates as well as to communicate with intergovernmental and supranational organizations such as the United Nations and later the European Union. Internationals also form supranational and regional branches (e.g. a European branch or an African branch) and maintain fraternal or governing relationships with sector-specific wings (e.g. youth or women's wings).

Internationals usually do not have a significant role. Internationals provide the parties an opportunity for sharing of experience. The parties belonging to internationals have various organizational obligations and can be expelled for not meeting those obligations. For example, during the 2011 Arab Spring the Socialist International expelled the governing parties of Tunisia and Egypt for performing actions incompatible with the values of this international.

List of internationals

Current 
Centrist Democrat International (Christian democracy), founded in 1961
Committee for a Workers' International (Trotskyism), founded in 2019 in its current form, originally founded in 1974
 Foro de São Paulo (socialism of the 21st century), founded in 1990
 Fourth International (Trotskyism), founded in 1938 by Leon Trotsky and later split into several competing internationals and subsequently reunified in 1963
 Global Greens (green politics), founded in 2001
 Humanist International (humanism), founded in 1989 by the Humanist Movement
 Informal Anarchist Federation (insurrectionary anarchism), founded in 2003
 International Alliance of Libertarian Parties (libertarianism), founded in 2015
 International of Anarchist Federations (synthesis anarchism), founded in 1968
 International Communist League (Fourth Internationalist) (Trotskyism), founded in 1979
 International Coordination of Revolutionary Parties and Organizations (Maoism), founded in 2010
 International Conference of Marxist–Leninist Parties and Organizations (Unity & Struggle) (Hoxhaism), founded in 1994
 International Democrat Union (conservatism), founded in 1983
 International League of Peoples' Struggle (anti-imperialism), founded in 2001
 International Marxist Tendency (Trotskyism), founded in 1992
 International Meeting of Communist and Workers Parties (Marxism–Leninism), founded in 1998
 International Monarchist League (monarchism, constitutional monarchy), founded in 1943
 International Revolutionary Left (Trotskyism), founded in 2019
 International Socialist Alternative (Trotskyism), founded in 2020
 International Socialist League (Trotskyism), founded in 2019
 International Socialist Tendency (Trotskyism), founded in 1958
 International Workers' Association (anarcho-syndicalism), founded in 1922
 International Workers League – Fourth International (Trotskyism), founded in 1982
 League for the Fifth International (Trotskyism), founded in 1989
 League for the Fourth International (Trotskyism), founded in 1996
 Liberal International (liberalism), founded in 1947 and constituted by the Oxford Manifesto
 Muslim Brotherhood (Islamism), founded in 1928
 Hizb ut-Tahrir (Islamism), founded in 1958
 Pirate Parties International (pirate politics), founded in 2010
 Progressive Alliance (social democracy and progressivism), a network of centre-left parties formed as a rival to the Socialist International in 2013
 Progressive International (democratic socialism and progressivism), an organization uniting progressive left-wing activists and organizations, formed in 2020
 Socialist International (social democracy), founded in 1951
 Trotskyist Fraction – Fourth International (Trotskyism), founded in 2004
 World Socialist Movement (Marxism), founded in 1904
 World Union of National Socialists (Nazism), founded in 1962

Defunct 
 Alliance of Democrats (liberalism), gathering groups similar in outlook to the European Democratic Party and the United States Democratic Party founded in 2005, but inactive since 2012
 Anarchist St. Imier International (anarchism), formed after the expulsion of the anarchists from the First International by the Marxist faction at the Hague Congress, founded in 1872 and defunct by 1877
 International Agrarian Bureau (agrarianism), operating from 1921 to 1972
 International Entente of Radical and Similar Democratic Parties (radicalism and liberalism), operating from 1923 to 1938
 Committee for a Workers' International (Trotskyism), founded in 1974
 Communist International  (revolutionary socialism), also known as Comintern and the Third International, a federation of communist parties founded in 1919 by Vladimir Lenin and dissolved in 1943 by Joseph Stalin
 E2D International (E-democracy, direct democracy), founded on 1 January 2011, but inactive since 29 August 2013
 Fascist International (fascism), also known as the 1934 Montreux Fascist conference, a conference of European fascist parties held on 16–17 December 1934 in Montreux, Switzerland
 International Libertarian Solidarity (anarchism), founded in 2001
 International Communist Seminar (Marxism–Leninism), founded in 1996 and defunct by 2014
 International Conference of Marxist–Leninist Parties and Organizations (International Newsletter), founded in 1998, defunct by 2017
 International Revolutionary Marxist Centre (Centrist Marxism), founded in 1932 and dissolved in 1940
 International Workingmen's Association (communism, anarchism and revolutionary socialism), commonly known as the First International, founded in 1864 and defunct by 1876
 International Working People's Association (anarchism), also known as the Black International, founded in 1881 and defunct by 1886
 Revolutionary Internationalist Movement, (Maoism) 1984–unknown
 Second International (socialism), founded in 1889 and dissolved in 1916
 Situationist International (libertarian socialism), revolutionary grouping operating from 1957 to 1972

Not internationals, but similar in functioning 
 All-African People's Revolutionary Party, Pan Africanist transnational political party with chapters both in Africa and in the United States
 Anarkismo.net, grouping of platformist/especifista anarchist political organisations launched in 2005 to facilitate greater international cooperation, but far from being an international at this point
 Communist Party of the Soviet Union (2001), transnational alliance of anti revisionist communist parties in the former Soviet Union
 Coordination Committee of Maoist Parties and Organisations of South Asia, transnational alliance of Maoist parties in South Asia
 Former Liberation Movements of Southern Africa, a conference of former anti colonial movements in Southern Africa
 Progressive Labor Party, transnational Marxist–Leninist political party with the stated goal of one world communist party
 International Conference of Asian Political Parties, founded in 2002, promotes cooperation and exchange between Asian parties of several ideologies
 International Communist Current, left communist international organization that does not believe in national parties but in one international organization
 International Communist Party, left communist international party that rejects the concept of a national party
 Transnational Radical Party, political association of libertarian, liberal and radical citizens, parliamentarians and government members of various national and political backgrounds founded in 1989 and associated with the United Nations Economic and Social Council
 Union of Communist Parties – Communist Party of the Soviet Union, transnational political alliance of communist parties in the former Soviet Union
 Volt Europa, European Federalist transnational political party with chapters in various European countries
 World Ecological Parties, association of centrist environmentalist parties founded in 2003
 Permanent Conference of Political Parties of Latin America and the Caribbean, promotes cooperation and exchange between Latin American parties of several ideologies
 Axis of Resistance—ideologically diverse; includes Shia Islamist, Baathist, and other factions affiliated with Iran and the Assad government in Syria. Notable members include Hezbollah, the Houthi Movement in Yemen, Palestinian Islamic Jihad, and the Popular Mobilization Forces in Iraq.

See also 
 Transnational political party
 List of international labor organizations
 List of left-wing internationals
 List of Trotskyist internationals

Footnotes 

 
Supraorganizations
Types of political parties